Calobata is a genus of flies belonging to the family Micropezidae.

The genus was first described by Meigen in 1803.

The species of this genus are found in Europe and Northern America.

Species include:
 Calobata petronella

References

Micropezidae